Inverness-shire was a county constituency of the House of Commons of the Parliament of Great Britain from 1708 to 1801 and of the Parliament of the United Kingdom from 1801 until 1918.

There was also a burgh constituency called Inverness Burghs, 1708 to 1918, and a county constituency called Inverness, 1918 to 1983.

Creation
The British parliamentary constituency was created in 1708 following the Acts of Union, 1707 and replaced the former Parliament of Scotland shire constituency of Inverness-shire.

History
The constituency elected one Member of Parliament (MP) by the first past the post system until the seat was abolished in 1918.

Boundaries 

The Inverness-shire Member of Parliament (MP) represented, nominally, the county of Inverness minus the Inverness parliamentary burgh, which was represented as a component of Inverness District of Burghs. However, by 1892 the boundaries of the county had been redefined for all purposes except parliamentary representation, and it had become a local government area, under the Local Government (Scotland) Act 1889. 26 years were to elapse before a review of constituency boundaries took account of new local government boundaries. Results of the review were implemented under the Representation of the People Act 1918.

In 1918, the constituency was largely replaced by two new county constituencies. The Western Isles constituency was created to cover Outer Hebridean areas of the county of Inverness, as well as part of the county of Ross and Cromarty. The Inverness constituency was created to cover the rest of the county of Inverness, including the parliamentary burgh.

Members of Parliament

Election results 
The original electorate for this constituency was limited to substantial landowners. The 40 shilling freehold qualification used for English county constituencies, which was not adjusted for inflation since it was first set in the 15th century, was significantly lower than the Scottish county qualification. In Scotland the qualification was land worth 40 shillings "of old extent", which prevented inflation lowering the real value of the property qualification required.

The county electorate, in Scotland, was significantly extended in 1832 and was further expanded in 1868 and 1885. The change, before and after 1832, can be seen by comparing the 32 votes cast at the contested election in 1802 with the 467 votes cast in 1832 (when the new registration system recorded a registered electorate of 669).

Unless otherwise indicated, the primary source for the results listed was Craig. Candidates identified by Craig as Conservatives, in the 1832-1835 Parliament, are listed as Tories. In elections before the formal creation of the Liberal Party, shortly after the 1859 general election, candidates identified by Craig as Liberals are classified as Whigs. There were no Radicals candidates in this seat, according to Stooks Smith. Craig's registered electorate and vote figures are sometimes different from those of Stooks Smith, but Craig's figures are used below. For details of the books of Craig and Stooks Smith, see the Reference section below.

The calculations of change in % vote and swing, for the 1835 general election result, relate the performance of the Conservative candidate to his achievements as the Tory candidate in the 1832 general election.

Elections in the 1800s

Elections in the 1830s 

Grant was appointed as President of the Board of Control, requiring a by-election.

 Appointment of Grant as Secretary of State for War and the Colonies and elevation to the peerage as the 1st Lord Glenelg

 Resignation of Chisholm, in June 1838

Elections in the 1840s 
 Death of Grant

Elections in the 1850s

Elections in the 1860s

Elections in the 1870s 

 Appointment of Cameron as a Groom in Waiting to Her Majesty

Elections in the 1880s

Elections in the 1890s 

 Since the last election Fraser-Mackintosh had lost the support of the Highland Land League; which endorsed the Liberal nominee MacGregor as a Crofters' candidate.
 Resignation of MacGregor'''

 The Highland Land League supported Macrae in this election, so he was a Crofters' candidate as well as the Liberal nominee. Results compared with 1892 election, not the 1895 by-election.

 Elections in the 1900s 

 Elections in the 1910s 

 Creation of Dewar as the 1st Baron Forteviot Constituency abolished (1918)References
 Boundaries of Parliamentary Constituencies 1885-1972, compiled and edited by F.W.S. Craig (Parliamentary Reference Publications 1972)
 British Parliamentary Election Results 1832-1885, compiled and edited by F.W.S. Craig (Macmillan Press 1977)
 British Parliamentary Election Results 1885-1918, compiled and edited by F.W.S. Craig (Macmillan Press 1974)
 The House of Commons 1754-1790, by Sir Lewis Namier and John Brooke (HMSO 1964)
 The Parliaments of England by Henry Stooks Smith (1st edition published in three volumes 1844–50), second edition edited (in one volume) by F.W.S. Craig (Political Reference Publications 1973)
 Who's Who of British Members of Parliament: Volume I 1832-1885, edited by M. Stenton (The Harvester Press 1976)
 Who's Who of British Members of Parliament, Volume II 1886-1918'', edited by M. Stenton and S. Lees (Harvester Press 1978)

Notes

Historic parliamentary constituencies in Scotland (Westminster)
Politics of the county of Inverness
Constituencies of the Parliament of the United Kingdom disestablished in 1918
Constituencies of the Parliament of the United Kingdom established in 1708